Marten River Provincial Park is a  provincial park in Northeastern Ontario, Canada. It is located by the hamlet of Marten River in the municipality of Temagami.

Background
Marten River Provincial Park features 193 campsites (105 of which have electrical hookups) in two campgrounds, Chicot (Sites 1-114) and Assinika (Sites 115-216). The park's feature attraction is a replica of a turn of the century logging camp, complete with a museum, camp buildings and outdoor displays of period logging equipment.

References

External links

Geography of Temagami
Provincial parks of Ontario
Parks in Nipissing District
Museums in Nipissing District
Forestry museums in Canada
Protected areas established in 1990
1990 establishments in Ontario